Colm Brophy (born 22 June 1966) is an Irish Fine Gael politician who has been a Teachta Dála (TD) for the Dublin South-West constituency since 2016. He served as Minister of State at the Department of Foreign Affairs from July 2020 to December 2022.

Originally from Cabinteely, Brophy studied business at Rathmines College of Commerce. Before becoming a councillor, he was the Director of Elections for the  European Parliament campaigns for Fine Gael candidates Mary Banotti and Gay Mitchell.

He was co-opted as a member of South Dublin County Council in 2008, and served as a councillor until 2016. 

At the 2016 general election, Brophy stood as one of three Fine Gael candidates in the Dublin South-West constituency. He won with 10.7% of the first preference votes, and was elected on the sixteenth count without reaching the quota. Brian Lawlor was co-opted to fill Brophy's seat on South Dublin County Council.

He was appointed Chair of the Dáil Committee on Budgetary Oversight in December 2017.

At the general election in February 2020, he won 12.2% of the first-preference votes, and was re-elected on the tenth count. Following the formation of the Government of the 33rd Dáil, Brophy was appointed on 1 July 2020 as the Minister of State for Overseas Development Aid and Diaspora. He said that his "focus in the coming months and years will be to listen to, and to support, our Diaspora communities, particularly its most vulnerable members".

He was not re-appointed as a junior minister as part of the 33rd Government of Ireland in December 2022.

Brophy is married to Maeve O'Connell, who is a Fine Gael councillor on Dún Laoghaire–Rathdown County Council.

References

External links
Colm Brophy's page on the Fine Gael website

Living people
Fine Gael TDs
Local councillors in South Dublin (county)
Members of the 32nd Dáil
Members of the 33rd Dáil
Politicians from Dublin (city)
1966 births
Ministers of State of the 33rd Dáil